Per Ludvig "Ludde" Juberg (April 23, 1884 – May 8, 1968) was a Swedish actor and theater director.

Filmography

1929: Konstgjorda Svensson as the medical orderly
1936: Ä' vi gifta? as Olsson, a porter
1937: Adolf Armstarke as the math professor and monk Antonius
1940: Mannen som alla ville mörda as district police superintendent Mörk
1940: Beredskapspojkar as "The Banana" Bengtsson
1940: Frestelse as Lambert Ljunggren
1944: Gröna hissen as a porter 
1944: Lilla helgonet as the porter at the Golden Lion hotel
1947: Försummad av sin fru as the hot dog salesman
1948: Soldat Bom as Zakarias
1949: Kvinna i vitt (as Alfred Blom
1949: Farlig vår as Nilheim, the vicar
1951: Starkare än lagen as the man in the cabin (uncredited)
1956: Egen ingång as the theater doorman
1958: Damen i svart as the church warden
1958: Mannekäng i rött as the museum caretaker

References

External links
 
 Ludde Juberg at the Swedish Film Database

1884 births
1968 deaths
20th-century Swedish male actors
Swedish male film actors
Swedish male stage actors
Swedish theatre directors
People from Uddevalla Municipality
Burials at Norra begravningsplatsen